Maradona Yeboah Adjei (born May 7, 1987), known by his stage names Guru and Gurunkz, is a Ghanaian rapper and fashion designer. Guru NKZ is a successful hiplife artist in Ghana. He is known for his contemporary hiplife rap style that combines English and Ghanaian indigenous languages. Guru's breakthrough was in 2011 when his hit song "Lapaz Toyota" appeared on the Ghanaian music charts. Guru's is considered a contemporary hiplife artist, as his songs venture new ground in the Ghanaian music scene mixing hip-hop, Afrobeats, Highlife, and Dancehall sounds.

Early life
Guru was born on May 7, 1987, in Accra and grew up in the small town of Nkoranza, in the Brong/Ahafo Region in Ghana. As a child, he attended the Reverend John Teye Memorial Institute and went to secondary school in Apam. He continued his education at NIIT and IPMC studying architecture and computer networking. Afterwards, he attended Zenith College in Accra, Ghana to study marketing.

Guru says his interest in music started when he was very young, but he did not pursue it as a career until he found himself performing at large events while in school like Miss SSS, a national contest in Ghana. He also made appearances on national radio programs. Guru was the first artist to win the WAPPI Talent Discovery Program in 2008, a national contest seeking underground music artist.

Music career
Guru recorded his first mixtape video with Ghanaian music artist Sarkodie in late 2009. His first major feature, bringing him into the national spotlight, was on Obrafour's song "Kasiebo", where he was named best featured artist by 4Syte TV Music Video Awards. He came out with his first studio album titled Platform, which also featured Sarkodie. Platform received six Vodafone Ghana Music Award nominations.

In 2011, he released the single "Lapaz Toyota". Influenced by the Azonto style sounds, the song became a hit. It was referenced by politicians during campaigns, and played at the Big Brother Africa finals. The video for the song was awarded the best male act by the City People Entertainment Awards.  The same year he also released the single "Karaoke".

In 2013, Guru came out with six singles: "Amen", "Azonoto Boys", "Abena", "Nkwada Nkwada" and "Alkayida (Boys Abre)". "Alkayida (Boys Abre)" came under fire from the government when some officials claimed it "promoted terrorism" because of the similarity of the song's title to terrorist organization Al-Qaeda. Guru refuted the ban, claiming it was a song meant to encourage hard work not violence saying, "Ghana is a peaceful country so why would I do a song to promote violence. I thought carefully about the song before coming out with it."

In 2015, Guru collaborated with Sarkodie on the song "Baggy Jeans". At the 2015 Ghana Music Awards, he received a nomination forhiplife/hip-hopp artist of the year and best hiplife song of the year for "Pooley Swag". He was described by hip-hop artist Jidenna as one of the greatest hip-hop artist in Africa along with WizKid, Don Jazzy and Akon. In spite of several nominations for music awards, including four major categories in the 2015 4Syte Music Video Awards in 2015, Guru has yet to win any causing some to wonder if there is some inner industry turmoil.

In 2018, Guru released his album Journey of Judah featuring Harrysong, Sarkodie, Lil Shaker and Ofori Amponsah.

Personal life

Humanitarian work

Guru participates on issues concerning environmental health. In March 2016 he joined other artists, advocating for a clean environment, mentioning that it was the best prevention against diseases like malaria.

Discography

References

Ghanaian rappers
1987 births
Living people